Perrine Delacour (born 5 April 1994) is a French professional golfer playing on the LPGA Tour.

Career
Delacour was a member of the French National Team and reached the semi-finals of the 2012 British Ladies Amateur Championship. She was one of four amateurs to earn LPGA Tour status at Final Stage of Q-School in 2012.

In 2013, Delacour was runner-up at the Eagle Classic, 3 strokes behind Christine Song, and at the Symetra Tour Championship. She finished eighth in the Symetra Tour rankings to gain full exemption for the 2014 LPGA Tour. Her best finish in 2014 was T15 at the Women's Australian Open, in 2015 it was a 4th at the Kingsmill Championship, in 2017 a tie for 7th at the Manulife LPGA Classic.

In 2019, ten top-10 finishes, including wins at the Four Winds Invitational and Prasco Charity Championship, helped her win the Symetra Tour Player of the Year and earn promotion to the 2020 LPGA Tour, where she finished 3rd at the Women's Australian Open.

Delacour set a tournament record at Manulife LPGA Classic with 62 (−10) in 2017. She qualified for the 2020 Tokyo Olympics along with Céline Boutier.

Amateur wins
2009 Girls Amateur Championship
2011 Irish Under 18 Open Stroke Play, French International Ladies Amateur Championship

Source:

Professional wins (2)

Symetra Tour wins (2)

Results in LPGA majors

CUT = missed the half-way cut
NT = no tournament

Team appearances
European Girls' Team Championship (representing France): 2012
Espirito Santo Trophy (representing France): 2012

Source:

References

External links

French female golfers
LPGA Tour golfers
Olympic golfers of France
Golfers at the 2020 Summer Olympics
1994 births
Living people
21st-century French women
20th-century French women